Kuraby is an outer southern suburb in the City of Brisbane, Queensland, Australia.

Geography 

Beenleigh Road is the main road connecting the suburb to the motorways leading to the city and further parts of Brisbane and beyond. Kuraby is serviced by a fast electric train service to Brisbane city and the Gold Coast, whilst a bus service takes commuters to the large shopping centres of Upper Mount Gravatt and Springwood.

The 1970s saw a Big W store with an adjoining Woolworths supermarket open in this suburb, which is now a part of the Underwood Marketplace.

The climate is sub-tropical with relatively dry winters and hot humid summers.
In practice one could throw a stick of wood into a creek one side of the suburb and eventually it would finish up in the Brisbane River whilst if one throws a stick in the opposite direction it would finish up in the Logan River. Both rivers eventually flow into Moreton Bay.
Because Kuraby is situated between these two rivers it tends to have a somewhat drier landscape than other parts of Brisbane. Rain tends to come up the Logan to the mountains [hills] behind Brisbane then back down the Brisbane River.
The topography ranges from high hills with very poor soil to low, very fertile soil areas.

A number of parks are situated within the area these cater for all types of activities from sporting to leisure.
The local council has reserved large tracts of native bush in the area surrounding many of these parks. This in turn has ensured that many of the wildlife species of the area survives.

History
The name "Kuraby" was officially gazetted on 16 August 1975 and derives from the local railway station name first used by the Railway Department in 1889. Originally the name came from an aboriginal word meaning “a place of many springs.”

The area of Kuraby was once known as Eight Miles Plains. Charles Baker was granted a Publican’s Licence on 12 December 1865. The modern Glen Hotel now stands there.  This was where Cobb & Co changed horses and the passengers were refreshed before continuing their journey to Beenleigh and further south.

The settlement of Kuraby began in 1860, when the Hollosons and Bakers cleared land and commenced farming. However, it was the opening of the Kuraby rail station on the South Coast railway line in 1885 that the name Kuraby came to be used (in preference to Eight Mile Plains or Spring Creek, the name then used to distinguish the area from Eight Mile Plains).

The Duke and Duchess of York opened the new Parliament House, Canberra, in 1927. Four years later they toured Australia, and in the middle of their hectic schedule, one night’s rest was arranged. The Royal Train was brought to the passing loop at Kuraby station and kept securely there with its pilot train. The timetable was re-arranged to enable them to have an un-interrupted evening. This event put the name of Kuraby on the map.

Kuraby State School was opened in 1928 and is situated within bushland surrounds.

St John's Anglican Church at 1410 Beenleigh Road was dedicated on 19 June 1960 by Archbishop Reginald Halse. It closed circa 1989. It was purchased in the early 1990s by the Islamic community and converted it into Kuraby Mosque.

Kuraby Special School opened in 1978.

On 21 September 2001, ten days after the 9/11 terrorist attacks, the Kuraby Mosque was the subject of an arson attack, the first mosque in the world to be attacked as a consequence of the terrorist attacks. The mosque was rebuilt.

In the  Kuraby had a population of 7,777. The median age of the Kuraby population was 33 years of age, 4 years below the Australian median. 50.8% of people living in Kuraby were born in Australia, compared to the national average of 69.8%; the next most common countries of birth were India 4%, New Zealand 3.8%, South Africa 3.5%, China 2.6%, England 2.2%. 54.1% of people spoke only English at home; the next most common languages were 5.3% Mandarin, 5% Arabic, 4.1% Cantonese, 2.3% Hindi, 1.9% Urdu.

As at 2019, there is little evidence of agriculture as housing estates occupy the former farm land.

Education 
Kuraby State School is a government primary (Prep-6) school for boys and girls at 1523 Beenleigh Road. In 2017, the school had an enrolment of 457 students with 35 teachers (29 full-time equivalent) and 24 non-teaching staff (14 full-time equivalent). It includes a special education program.

Kuraby Special School is a special primary and secondary (Prep-12) school for boys and girls at 83 Alpita Street. In 2017, the school had an enrolment of 70 students with 20 teachers (17 full-time equivalent) and 34 non-teaching staff (19 full-time equivalent).

There are no secondary schools in Kuraby. The nearest secondary schools are in neighbouring Runcorn and Rochedale.

Culture
Kuraby has a diverse population mix of old and young. Some of the older residents can trace their families back to the early settlement of the area. A number of the local streets now bear their name.

Many nationalities from different parts of the world now call Kuraby home. The Muslim community has a mosque in Kuraby while there is a Buddhist temple situated in a nearby suburb. Many other religions have their place of worship either in the suburb or in the surrounding suburbs.

Young families are attracted to Kuraby as it has many facilities to cater for them.  Several doctors and a chemist have set up business in Kuraby to cater for the health needs of the population. Kuraby has its own community centre (the infrastructure is owned by the local council) and is run by a volunteer committee of local people who are responsible for seeing that the building is maintained and improvements are implemented.

Transport
Kuraby railway station provides access to regular Queensland Rail City network services to Brisbane and Beenleigh.

References

Further reading

External links

 University of Queensland: Queensland Places: Kuraby

Suburbs of the City of Brisbane